

The golden coin turtle or Chinese three-striped box turtle (Cuora trifasciata) is a species of turtle endemic to southern China.

Distribution
The species is distributed in China, but only on the island of Hainan (it is extirpated from the mainland Guangdong, Guangxi, and Fujian provinces), as well as Hong Kong. The populations from other parts of Vietnam and Laos are now regarded a separate species, the Vietnamese three-striped box turtle (C. cyclornata).

Description

This species has three distinct black stripes on its brown carapace, with a yellow, slightly hooked upper jaw and a yellow stripe extending from the back of the mouth. The plastron is mostly black with a yellow border.

Diet
In Hong Kong, this species feeds on fish, frogs, and carrion, but remains of crabs, snails, and insects have been found in its feces. It can grow up to 25 cm (10 in).

Taxonomy
It hybridizes very easily with its relatives in captivity and in the wild, and hybrids may be fertile. Several of these have been described as new species, such as the Fujian pond turtle (Mauremys × iversoni), a hybrid between (usually) males of this species and females of the Asian yellow pond turtle (Mauremys mutica). In addition, the golden coin turtle is suspected to be a parent of the supposed species Chinese false-eyed turtle and Philippen's striped turtle.

Conservation
The species is considered critically endangered by the IUCN. It is used in  folk medicine, e.g. as the key ingredient for the Chinese medicinal dessert guīlínggāo (龜苓膏); thus, it is under threat because of unsustainable hunting. It is one of the most endangered turtle species in the world, according to a 2003 assessment by the IUCN.  C. trifasciata is listed among Turtle Conservation Coalition's 25 most endangered tortoises and freshwater turtles.

Farming
C. trifasciata is raised on some of China's turtle farms. Based on the data from a large sample (almost one-half of all registered turtle farms in the country), researchers estimated that the turtle farmers participating in the survey had the total herd of 115,900 turtles of this species; they sold 20,600 turtles of this species per year, with the estimated value of almost US$37 million. This would make a farm-raised C. trifasciata worth almost $1,800, making them by far the most expensive species tabulated in the survey (by comparison, a common  Pelodiscus sinensis raised for food would be worth under $7, and a Cuora mouhotii, sold for the pet trade, around $80). Taking into account the registered farms that did not respond to the survey, as well as the unregistered producers, the total numbers must be significantly higher.  Wild C. trifasciata turtles are far more valuable than farmed-raised turtles of this species to both traditional Chinese medicine practitioners and illegal wildlife traders.  The gender of C. trifasciata is determined by gestation temperatures.  Due to incubation temperatures at farms in warm lowlands, farms have only been able to produce females.  This increased the price of wild-caught males to $20,000.  Most farmed C. trifasciata turtles are hybrids, which can escape and establish populations, causing genetic pollution.

The largest C. trifasciata farming operation is said to be located in Boluo County, Guangdong. According to the farm's founder Li Yi (李艺), the farm was started in 1989 with eight wild turtles (two males and six females) bought at a local market, and now has "over 2000" turtles. According to the farm's site, captive-born turtles start breeding at 8 years of age.

References

Further reading
 Blanck, T., W.P. Mccord & M. Le (2006): On the Variability of Cuora trifasciata. Edition Chimaira. 153pp.
 Buskirk, James R.; Parham, James F. & Feldman, Chris R. (2005): On the hybridisation between two distantly related Asian turtles (Testudines: Sacalia × Mauremys). Salamandra 41: 21–26. PDF fulltext
 da Nóbrega Alves, Rômulo Romeu; da Silva Vieira; Washington Luiz & Gomes Santana, Gindomar (2008): Reptiles used in traditional folk medicine: conservation implications. Biodiversity and Conservation 17(8): 2037–2049.  (HTML abstract, PDF first page)
 Parham, James Ford; Simison, W. Brian; Kozak, Kenneth H.; Feldman, Chris R. & Shi, Haitao (2001): New Chinese turtles: endangered or invalid? A reassessment of two species using mitochondrial DNA, allozyme electrophoresis and known-locality specimens. Animal Conservation 4(4): 357–367. PDF fulltext Erratum: Animal Conservation 5(1): 86 HTML abstract

External links
Hong Kong Reptile & Amphibian Society
Cuora trifasciata
Information of species
Asian Turtle Network: Cuora trifasciata
Species 2000
Wetlands Biodiversity of Cambodia Retrieved 2007-05-04

Cuora
Reptiles described in 1825
Reptiles of China
Reptiles of Hong Kong
Turtles of Asia
Critically endangered fauna of China